Tim Cooper was an association football player who represented New Zealand at international level.

Cooper made his full All Whites debut in a 6-4 win over New Caledonia on 22 September 1952 and ended his international playing career with eight A-international caps to his credit, his final cap an appearance in a 1-4 loss to Australia on 4 September 1954.

References 

 Year of birth missing
 Year of death missing
 New Zealand association footballers
 New Zealand international footballers
Association football fullbacks